Burnett County Abstract Company is a real estate services company providing full title, escrow, and closing services in Burnett County, Wisconsin. It is located in Siren.

The company was founded in 1906 in Grantsburg by six citizens of that town. Its historic Grantsburg building, completed in 1908, was added to the National Register of Historic Places in 1980.

References

Commercial buildings on the National Register of Historic Places in Wisconsin
Companies based in Wisconsin
Real estate companies established in 1906
National Register of Historic Places in Burnett County, Wisconsin
1906 establishments in Wisconsin
Commercial buildings in Wisconsin
Commercial buildings completed in 1908